Sewad Chhoti is a small village in the Sikar district of Rajasthan, India. The village had a population of 2,153 in 2011.

References

Villages in Sikar district